The Voice of Germany (season 1) is a German reality talent show that premiered on 24 November 2011 on ProSieben and Sat.1. Based on the reality singing competition The Voice of Holland, the series was created by Dutch television producer John de Mol. It is part of an international series.

Development, production and marketing 

In April 2011, ProSieben announced its intention to bring an adaptation of The Voice of Holland to the Germany. In July 2011, ProSieben began announcements of the coaches/judges for the series. First to sign on were Nena and Xavier Naidoo. Rea Garvey and "Boss Burns" (Alec Völkel) & "Hoss Power" (Sascha Vollmer) came on board in late August 2011.

Stefan Gödde is the show's host. Doris Golpashin is hosting backstage special for the official website.
Season 1 premiered on ProSieben on 24 November 2011. RTL took on a ratings fight when they programmed their successful talent show Das Supertalent against newcomer The Voice of Germany. While RTL could win the battle overall with 5.83 million viewers (18.1% market share) compared to The Voice of Germany's 3.89 million viewers (12.4% market share), the ProSieben show won among the target group 14-49 with 3.06 million viewers (23.8% market share) against Das Supertalent's 2.99 million viewers (22.8% market share). The following day, The Voice of Germany aired on Sat.1 for the first time.

On Sat.1, The Voice of Germany extended its viewers to 4.36 million viewers (14.3% market share) overall and in the target group 14-49 the viewers were almost the same with 3.05 million viewers (26.6% market share).

The show saw a significant drop in ratings during the live shows.
The final was watched by 4.01 million viewers, a market share of 12.9%.

The first phase: The Blind Auditions 

The castings to the first season took place in June and July, 2011, however, were not shown on television. About 150 the singers  – more than three-quarters of them with experience of the stage – were invited to the Blind Auditions. These were taped at the end of August and at the beginning of September, 2011 in Berlin and were emitted from 24 November to 9 December 2011 in six telecasts. The jury chose 64 candidates in the second phase, in the Nena and Rea Garvey with 16, The BossHoss with 15 and Xavier Naidoo with 17 candidates entered.

Episode 1: November 24, 2011

Episode 2: November 25, 2011

Episode 3: December 1, 2011

Episode 4: December 2, 2011

Episode 5: December 8, 2011

Episode 6: December 9, 2011

The second phase: The Battle Rounds 
The Battle Round was taped in September, 2011 in Berlin and is emitted from the 15th to the 23rd of December in four telecasts. After the end of the Battles every coach had only six candidates, for the rest. Two teams, Xavier and The BossHoss, had to organise a Trio-Battle on account of her odd candidate number. With these The BossHoss were allowed to do two candidates to wide decrees, Xavier, nevertheless, only one. Remained 24 candidates entered in the live shows.

 – Battle Winner

Episode 7: December 15, 2011

Episode 8: December 16, 2011

Episode 9: December 22, 2011

Episode 10: December 23, 2011

Sing-off 

Each coach nominate 5 singers from their group to advance to the live shows. The 3 remaining singers per group will do a sing-off for the remaining live show spot.

 – Sing-off Winner

The third phase: The Live Shows 
The seven live shows will take place between the 5th of January and the 10th of February, 2012. The first show is broadcast by ProSieben on Thursday 5th and the other six by Sat.1 every Friday evening. During the first show the contestants of Xavier Naidoo and The Boss Hoss perform. During the second show the contestants who sing are from Teams Nena and Rea Garvey. After each of these shows, in each team, two contestants are automatically sent to the next round thanks to the votes of the audience, two are voted off and two are chosen by their coaches to stay. After the first two shows, only 16 singers will remain and perform in the third (for teams Boss Hoss and Xavier Naidoo) or fourth (for teams Nena and Rea Garvey) live show. The third show will air on Jan 13 and the fourth, on Jan 20. During the fifth show, on Jan 27, the 12 remaining contestants will perform (3 from each team). During the halffinale, on Feb 3, the 8 remaining contestants will perform (2 from each team). During the finale, on Feb 10, the 4 remaining contestants will perform (1 from each team).

Episode 11: January 5, 2012
Team Xavier and Team BossHoss performed.
 Date: 5 January 2012
 Episode: 11
 Channel: ProSieben
 Team: Team Xavier, Team BossHoss
 Celebrity Performer: Snow Patrol with "This Isn't Everything You Are"

Non-competition performances

Episode 12: January 6, 2012
Team Nena and Team Rea performed.
 Date: 6 January 2012
 Episode: 12
 Channel: Sat.1
 Team: Team Nena, Team Rea
 Celebrity Performer: Söhne Mannheims with "Für dich"

Competition Performances

Non-competition performances

Episode 13: January 13, 2012
Team Xavier and Team BossHoss performed.
 Date: 13 January 2012
 Episode: 13
 Channel: Sat.1
 Team: Team Xavier, Team BossHoss
 Celebrity Performer: James Morrison with "Up"

Non-competition performances

Episode 14: January 20, 2012
Team Nena and Team Rea performed.
 Date: 20 January 2012
 Episode: 14
 Channel: Sat.1
 Team: Team Nena, Team Rea
 Celebrity Performer: The BossHoss with "Don't gimme that"

Competition Performances

Non-competition performances

Episode 15: January 27, 2012
 Date: 27 January 2012
 Episode: 15
 Channel: Sat.1
 Team: Team Nena, Team Rea, Team Xavier, Team BossHoss
 Celebrity Performer: Rea Garvey with "Colour Me In"  & Taio Cruz with "Troublemaker"

Competition Performances

Non-competition performances

Episode 16: February 3, 2012
 Date: 3 February 2012
 Episode: 16
 Channel: Sat.1
 Team: Team Nena, Team Rea, Team Xavier, Team BossHoss
 Celebrity Performer:

The remaining acts will perform in a battle and both will perform an entire new song each.

Competition Performances

The Battles

Episode 17: February 10, 2012
 Date: 10 February 2012
 Episode: 17
 Channel: Sat.1
 Team: Team Nena, Team Rea, Team Xavier, Team BossHoss
 Celebrity Performer:

Each contestant perform a longer version of his winner's song, a duet with the coach and a celebrity duet.

Winner's songs

Coaches' duet

Celebrity Duet

Results table

Team BossHoss

Team Nena

Team Rea

Team Xavier

Elimination Chart

Overall 
Color key
Artist's info

Result details

  Artist Saved by the public
  Artist Saved by his/her coach
  Artist was eliminated
  Artist did not perform on that particular week

Ratings

References

External links
 Official website on ProSieben.de
 The Voice of Germany on fernsehserien.de

2011 German television seasons
1